Malcolm Margolin (born October 27, 1940) is an author, publisher, and former executive director of Heyday Books, an independent nonprofit publisher and cultural institution in Berkeley, California. From his founding of Heyday in 1974 until his retirement at the end of 2015, he oversaw the publication of several hundred books and the creation of two quarterly magazines: News from Native California, devoted to the history and ongoing cultural concerns of California Indians, and Bay Nature, devoted to the natural history of the San Francisco Bay Area. In the fall of 2017, he established a new enterprise, the California Institute for Community, Art, and Nature (California ICAN) to continue and expand upon the work that he began more than forty years ago.

Margolin is the author/editor of several books including The Ohlone Way: Indian Life in the San Francisco-Monterey Bay Area, named by the San Francisco Chronicle as one of the hundred most important books of the twentieth century by a western writer. His essays and articles have appeared in a number of periodicals including The Nation, the San Francisco Chronicle, and the Los Angeles Times.

Early life and education 
Margolin was born in Boston, Massachusetts on October 27, 1940 to a Lithuanian mother and an American father. He attended Boston Latin School and Harvard University, where he earned a degree in English Literature in 1964. He met his wife Rina while attending Harvard; she was a psychology major at Radcliffe College.

After college he lived in Puerto Rico (1964–1966) and New York City's Lower East Side (1966–1968). He visited Yosemite National Park in the summer of 1967. In 1969, he moved with Rina to California.

Career 
Margolin has lectured widely and has served as advisor and mentor to many other publishers. In addition to founding Heyday (1974), News from Native California (1987), and Bay Nature (2001), he co-founded the Alliance for California Traditional Arts (1997), an organization devoted to California folk arts, and has served on its board since its beginning. In 2001, he co-founded Inlandia Institute, a literary center in Riverside, California.

He currently serves on the Publication Committee of the Book Club of California and devotes time and effort to a number of environmental, cultural, and social justice organizations and causes.

Personal life 
He has lived in Berkeley, California since the late 1960s, where he and his wife, Rina, have raised three children: Reuben (1970), Sadie (1974), and Jacob (1980).

Bibliography 
Books authored by Margolin include:

Margolin, Malcolm; Linsteadt, Sylvia. Wonderments of the East Bay. Berkeley: Heyday. 2014. .
Bancroft, Kim. The Heyday of Malcolm Margolin: The Damn Good Times of a Fiercely Independent Publisher. Berkeley: Heyday. 2014. .
La Perouse, Jean-Francois de Galaup; Edited, introduced, with extensive commentary by Malcolm Margolin. Life in a California Mission: Monterey in 1786. Berkeley: Heyday. 1989. .
Margolin, Malcolm. Deep Hanging Out: Wanderings and Wonderment in Native California. Berkeley: Heyday. 2021. .

Awards
He has received many honors including a Lifetime Achievement Award from the San Francisco Bay Area Book Reviewers Association, a Community Leadership Award from the San Francisco Foundation, a Gold Medal from the Commonwealth Club of California, an American Book Award from the Before Columbus Foundation, and a Cultural Freedom Award from the Lannan Foundation.

In 2012 he received the chairman's Commendation from the National Endowment for the Humanities, the second person in the United States to be so honored.

 2001 – American Book Award for Publishing/Editing, Before Columbus Foundation
 Award for Organizational Excellence, American Association of State and Local History
 California Council for the Promotion of History Award
 California Indian Health Services Award
 "California State Assembly Resolution" honoring Heyday
 Carey McWilliams Award for Lifetime Achievement, California Studies Association
 Chairman's Commendation, National Endowment for the Humanities
 Cultural Freedom Award, Lannan Foundation 
 Distinguished Service Award from the Society of Professional Journalists
 Fred Cody Award, Bay Area Book Reviewers Association
 Gerbode Fellowship
 Helen Crocker Russell Award for Community Leadership, San Francisco Foundation
 The Hubert Howe Bancroft Award, The Bancroft Library
 Martin Baumhoff Award for Achievement by the Society for California Archaeology
 The Oscar Lewis Award for Contributions to Western History, Book Club of California
 Presidential Commendation, The Society for California Archaeology
 Publishing Award, California Horticultural Society
 Special recognition for leadership in the arts, California Arts Council

References

External links
 California ICAN (http://www.californiaican.org)

Historians of Native Americans
American nature writers
American male non-fiction writers
American book editors
American book publishing company founders
American magazine editors
American magazine publishers (people)
American magazine founders
Writers from Berkeley, California
Businesspeople from Berkeley, California
Culture in the San Francisco Bay Area
American Book Award winners
Harvard University alumni
1940 births
Living people
Jewish American writers
20th-century American Jews
21st-century American Jews
20th-century American non-fiction writers
20th-century American male writers
21st-century American non-fiction writers
21st-century American male writers
American people of Lithuanian descent